Drezzo is a frazione of the comune (municipality) of Colverde in the Province of Como in the Italian region Lombardy, located about  northwest of Milan and about  west of Como, on the border with Switzerland. It was a separate comune until 2014.

 

Cities and towns in Lombardy